The Crime Nobody Saw is a 1937 American comedy film directed by Charles Barton and written by Bertram Millhauser. The film stars Lew Ayres, Ruth Coleman, Eugene Pallette, Benny Baker, Vivienne Osborne, Colin Tapley and Howard Hickman. The film was released on March 12, 1937, by Paramount Pictures.

Plot
The Plot follows play-authors, Horace Dryden, Nick Milburn and "Babe" Lawton, who are in an apartment seeking inspiration, when suddenly a intoxicated man enters and collapses on the floor. The man had $15,000 with him, but things go bad when they find that the man was murdered.

Cast 
Lew Ayres as Nick Milburn
Ruth Coleman as Kay Mallory
Eugene Pallette as 'Babe' Lawton
Benny Baker as Horace Dryden
Vivienne Osborne as Suzanne Duval
Colin Tapley as Dr. Randolph Brooks
Howard Hickman as Robert Mallory
Robert Emmett O'Connor as Officer Tim Harrigan
Jed Prouty as William Underhill
Hattie McDaniel as Ambrosia
Ferdinand Gottschalk as John Atherton
Ellen Drew as Secretary

References

External links 
 

1937 films
1930s English-language films
American comedy films
1937 comedy films
Paramount Pictures films
Films directed by Charles Barton
American black-and-white films
1930s American films